Bernhard Zintl (born June 16, 1965) is a retired male pole vaulter from Germany, who represented West Germany during his career. He set his personal best (5.65 metres) on 26 August 1989 in the final of the 1989 Summer Universiade in Duisburg, earning him a gold medal.

Achievements

References
trackfield.brinkster

1965 births
Living people
German male pole vaulters
West German pole vaulters
Universiade medalists in athletics (track and field)
Universiade gold medalists for West Germany
Medalists at the 1989 Summer Universiade